Sarah Churm (born 1980 in Scarrington, Nottinghamshire) is an English actress, known for playing the part of Sarah in At Home with the Braithwaites from 2000 until 2003. She also appeared in a stage adaptation of the popular book The Story of Tracy Beaker by Jacqueline Wilson called Tracy Beaker Gets Real.

Churm's other television work include appearances in Holby City, Heartbeat, Where the Heart Is, Doctors, Love Soup, Sweet Medicine and The Upper Hand. In November 2013 she appeared in the one-off 50th anniversary comedy homage The Five(ish) Doctors Reboot. Churm also appears as Helen in the 2011 film drama Weekend.
She recently portrayed Grant's mother in the TV series Utopia.

References

External links

Living people
1980 births
English television actresses
People from Rushcliffe (district)